Keats is a crater on Mercury. The crater's name was adopted by the International Astronomical Union (IAU) in 1976 and named after an English poet. This poet is known as John Keats, who lived from 1795 to 1821.

The rays of nearby Han Kan crater overlie Keats.  The crater Dickens is south of Keats.

References

Impact craters on Mercury